Kakogawa Municipal General Gymnasium is an arena in Kakogawa, Hyogo, Japan.

References

Basketball venues in Japan
Indoor arenas in Japan
Nishinomiya Storks
Sports venues in Hyōgo Prefecture
Kakogawa, Hyōgo
Sports venues completed in 2005
2005 establishments in Japan